Lyubomir Runtov (born 7 May 1942) is a Bulgarian water polo player. He competed in the men's tournament at the 1972 Summer Olympics.

References

1942 births
Living people
Bulgarian male water polo players
Olympic water polo players of Bulgaria
Water polo players at the 1972 Summer Olympics
Sportspeople from Sofia